Join the Band may refer to:
 Join the Band (Take 6 album), a 1994 album by Take 6
 Join the Band (Little Feat album), a 2008 album by Little Feat